"Alone" is a song by Dutch disc jockey and record producer Armin van Buuren. It features vocals and lyrics from American singer and songwriter Lauren Evans. The song was released in the Netherlands by Armada Music on 7 March 2014 as the sixth single from van Buuren's fifth studio album Intense.

Music video
A music video to accompany the release of "Alone" was first released onto YouTube on 27 February 2014. It was directed by Svenno Koemans. The music video was shot in New York at the crossroads between Broadway and East 8th Street. It shows cars arrested in front of the crossroads. The first is driven by Lauren Evans. The second is driven by a man alongside Armin van Buuren. The others driven by people who are breaking their relationships with their partner. Then an old man faints on the pedestrian crossing. But nobody cares of him. Only Evans and van Buuren try to save him. They ask help to the other passengers who ignore the situation. At the end, the man regains consciousness.

Track listing
 Digital download / CD single 
 "Alone" (Radio Edit) – 3:19

 Digital download - Thomas Newson Remix 
 "Alone" (Thomas Newson Remix) - 5:15

 Digital download - Thomas Newson Remixes 
 "Alone" (Thomas Newson Radio Edit) – 3:37
 "Alone" (Thomas Newson Remix) - 5:15

 More Intense - Orjan Nilsen Remix
 "Alone" (Orjan Nilsen Remix) - 7:40

Charts

References 

2014 singles
Armin van Buuren songs
2014 songs
Songs written by Armin van Buuren
Armada Music singles
Songs written by Benno de Goeij